Montemezzo is a comune (municipality) in the Province of Como in the Italian region Lombardy, located about  north of Milan and about  northeast of Como. As of 31 December 2004, it had a population of 270 and an area of 9.1 km².

Montemezzo borders the following municipalities: Gera Lario, Samolaco, Sorico, Trezzone, Vercana.

Demographic evolution

References

Cities and towns in Lombardy